("lucky urchin" or "plentiful little pig") is the Manx term for hedgehog. In Manx folklore it is a type of fairy animal that takes the form of a white pig that brings good fortune to those who manage to catch it. It was even considered a favourable omen just to have seen the "lucky piggy". It was also said that if you caught one you would always find a silver coin in your pocket.

In Fairy Tales From the Isle of Man (1951) by Dora Broome, the white pig is described as having red eyes and ears, and though it can alter its size it is not able to change its shape.

See also 

 Adhene
 Buggane
 Fenodyree
 Glashtyn
 Jimmy Squarefoot
 Moddey Dhoo
 Mooinjer veggey
 Sleih beggey

References 

Fairies
Fantasy creatures
Hedgehogs
Legendary mammals
Manx language
Manx legendary creatures